About a Dog was Debbie Barham's last comedy proposal before she died in 2003.  The programme stars Alan Davies, playing a dog, Jack, with his owner, Sarah, played by Kate Ashfield in the first series and Claire Goose in the second, in a sitcom told through the eyes of a canine.

Developed by Above the Title Productions and subsequently scripted by Graeme Garden from Barham's notes, this comedy explores the unique relationship between dogs and their owners and asks if your 'best friend' has some essential 'doggy wisdom' to offer you.

The programmes were produced by Jon Naismith.  Graeme Garden wrote a second series of the show that was broadcast in 2007.

Episode list
Series 1

Episode 1: 'Let Sleeping Dogs Lie' (6 October 2004)
Episode 2: 'We Was Robbed!' (13 October 2004)
Episode 3: 'Love, Probably' (20 October 2004)

Series 2

Episode 1: 'A Munch in the Country' (10 July 2007)
Episode 2: 'A Tail of Love' (17 July 2007)
Episode 3: 'Mistress and Commander' (24 July 2007)
Episode 4: 'Bitchcraft' (31 July 2007)
Episode 5: 'Every Dog Has His Day' (7 August 2007)
Episode 6: 'Collars and Cuffs' (14 August 2007)

References

External links
BBC Homepage
Series 1 links from Above the Title
Series 2 links from Above the Title

BBC Radio comedy programmes
2004 radio programme debuts
BBC Radio 4 programmes